Cane Creek may refer to:

Cane Creek (Indiana), a stream in Indiana
Cane Creek (Butler County, Missouri), a stream in southern Missouri
Cane Creek (Byrd Creek), a stream in southeast Missouri
Cane Creek (Haw River tributary, right bank), a stream in Alamance County, North Carolina
Cane Creek (Haw River tributary, left bank), a stream in Alamance County, North Carolina
Cane Creek (Hyco River tributary), a stream in Caswell and Person Counties, North Carolina
Cane Creek Cycling Components, a manufacturer and designer of cycling components; see Dia-Compe